Duckpuddle is a river in the Pevensey Levels of East Sussex, England.

Duckpuddle may also refer to:
Duckpuddle Pond, a lake in Lincoln County, Maine, United States
Duckpuddle Run, a river in Monroe County, Pennsylvania, United States
A puddle in which a duck is residing